Yseult Le Danois (1920–1985) was a French zoologist who published a review of pufferfish and a 1964 monograph on frogfish.

References

French ichthyologists
1920 births
1985 deaths
Women ichthyologists
20th-century French zoologists
20th-century French women scientists